Anaerocella is a bacterial genus from the family of Rikenellaceae. up to now there is only one species of this genus known (Anaerocella delicata).

References

Further reading 
 

Bacteroidia
Monotypic bacteria genera
Bacteria genera